John, Paul, George, and Ben is a children's picture book written and illustrated by American illustrator Lane Smith.  Released in 2006 through Hyperion Books, this picture book tells the story of five of the Founding Fathers of American independence: John Hancock, Paul Revere, George Washington, Benjamin Franklin and Thomas Jefferson. The book describes each of them to be independent, bold, honest, clever, or noisy. The name of the book is a parody of the names of the members of the British band The Beatles; John, Paul, George and Ringo, with Ben replacing Ringo. It was awarded the Zena Sutherland Award for best overall book by the University of Chicago Laboratory Schools.

Awards
It also received the following awards and recognitions: Horn Book Fanfare Award, Book Sense Summer Children's Pick, School Library Journal Best Books of 2006, New York Times Best Illustrated Book of the Year, Quills Award Nominee, Child Magazine Best Book of the Year, Oppenheim Toy Portfolio Platinum Book Award Winner, Publishers Weekly Best Book of the Year, National Parenting Publication Gold Award Winner, Parenting Magazine Best Book of the Year, New York Times Notable Book, The Columbus Dispatch Top 20, New York Daily News Best Of list, San Francisco Chronicle Year End Picks, NYPL 100 Titles for Reading and Sharing, New York Bookbinders Design Merit Award, St. Louis Post Dispatch Best Book, 2006 Blue Ribbon Book from the Bulletin of the Center for Children's Books, Miami Herald Best Book, and Chicago Public Library Best of the Best.

It was a New York Times and Publishers Weekly bestseller.

Adaptations
In 2007, Weston Woods Studios adapted the book to an animated film narrated by James Earl Jones.

2006 children's books
American picture books
American non-fiction books
Children's history books
Books about the American Revolution 
Hyperion Books books